Welch Municipal Airport  is a city-owned, public-use airport located three nautical miles (6 km) southeast of the central business district of Welch, a city in McDowell County, West Virginia, United States.

Facilities and aircraft 
Welch Municipal Airport covers an area of 65 acres (26 ha) at an elevation of 2,118 feet (646 m) above mean sea level. It has one runway designated 9/27 with an asphalt surface measuring 2,695 by 50 feet (821 x 15 m).

For the 12-month period ending December 31, 2009, the airport had 65 aircraft operations, an average of 5 per month: 92% general aviation and 8% military. At that time there were two single-engine aircraft based at this airport.

This airport has been closed since at least 2013.  The nearest active airport is Kee Field near Windom, West Virginia.

References

External links 
 Aerial image as of April 1996 from USGS The National Map
 

Airports in West Virginia
Transportation in McDowell County, West Virginia